Mattia Barbieri (born 29 April 2002), known professionally as Rondodasosa, is an Italian rapper. Born in San Siro, Milan, he began his musical career in 2020, releasing his debut EP Giovane Rondo the same year.

Early life
Mattia Barbieri was born on April 29, 2002 in the San Siro district of Milan, Italy. As he reported in an interview for GRM Daily. In order to prevent himself from being sentenced to juvenile prison, he would get a job at McDonalds in 2020, later working as a waiter at a restaurant for €600 a month.

Career
In January 2020, Mattia released his debut song, "Free Samy", which was dedicated to a friend in prison. By February 2021, the song had over 3 million streams on Spotify. But He began to acquire an important notoriety only in May of the same year, with the remix of Exposing Me, Chicago's Drill track belonging to King Von and Memo600, entitled by the Milanese rapper as Face to Face, which is still his most successful single on youtube. He also released "Louboutin" alongside Vale Pain, which resulted in Rondodasosa being compared to Pop Smoke. It would peak at number 22 in Italy and was certified platinum by the FIMI.

In October 2020, Rondodasosa released his debut EP, Giovane Rondo, which included features from Capo Plaza and Shiva. The EP peaked at number 6 and was certified gold by the FIMI.

In February 2021, Rondodasosa released "Movie", which featured Central Cee; the single peaked at number 26 in Italy and was certified gold by the FIMI. In May, Rondodasosa would appear on a remix of "Body" by Russ Millions and Tion Wayne alongside Capo Plaza. He would also release "Dubai" (peaked at number 27), "Shawty" (peaked at number 36) and "Chinga" (peaked at number 49) in the same year.

In 2022, Rondodasosa would appear on Central Cee's "Eurovision", which was featured on 23.

On November 4th 2022, Rondodasosa released his debut album, Trenches Baby. The album peaked at number 1 in Italy.

Legal issues
In 2020, Mattia was reported to police for jumping on the hood of a police cruiser in San Siro. In January 2021, his Instagram account was disabled for criticizing the Italian government on its management of the COVID-19 pandemic.

On 20 August 2021, he received a DASPO from Milanese police for 2 years following riots at a disco; the order prevented him from entering bars, discos and public places in the city.

Discography

Studio albums

EPs

Charted singles

As lead artist

As featured artist

References

Italian rappers

2002 births
Living people
Musicians from Milan
Warner Records artists
Trap musicians
Drill musicians